Røsvik Church is a parish church of the Church of Norway in Sørfold Municipality in Nordland county, Norway. It is located in the village of Røsvika. It is one of the churches for the Sørfold parish which is part of the Salten prosti (deanery) in the Diocese of Sør-Hålogaland. The brown, gothic-style, wooden church was built in a long church style in 1883 by the architects Knut Guttormsen and Jon Andersen Leistad. The church seats about 600 people.

See also
List of churches in Sør-Hålogaland

References

Sørfold
Churches in Nordland
Wooden churches in Norway
19th-century Church of Norway church buildings
Churches completed in 1883
1883 establishments in Norway
Long churches in Norway